In cricket, a ground is a location where cricket matches are played, comprising a cricket field, cricket pavilion and any associated buildings and amenities. 

A batter's ground is the area behind the popping crease at their end of the pitch. It is one of the two safe zones that batters run between to score runs.

Location for matches

In addition to the cricket field, the ground may include a pavilion, viewing areas or stadium, a car park, shops, bars, floodlights, sight screens, gates, and conference facilities.

Parts of the pitch

A batter's ground is the area behind the popping crease at his end of the pitch. In general, a ground belongs only to the batter who is closest to it, and stays so until the other batter gets closer to it. 

Whether a batter is in or out of his ground is defined by Law 30 of the Laws of Cricket. So long as the batter has his body or his bat (that he is holding) touching the ground, he is in it, and is said to have "made good his ground". 

Batters can run between the two grounds to score runs. However, if a batter is out of his ground (which can happen when he enters a ground that another batter is already occupying), he may be dismissed (prevented from further scoring) by being run out or stumped if the wicket in his ground is put down by the ball.

References

 
Cricket terminology